Featherstone's algorithm is a technique used for computing the effects of forces applied to a structure of joints and links (an "open kinematic chain") such as a skeleton used in ragdoll physics.

The Featherstone's algorithm uses a reduced coordinate representation.  This is in contrast to the more popular Lagrange multiplier method, which uses maximal coordinates.  Brian Mirtich's PhD Thesis has a very clear and detailed description of the algorithm.  Baraff's paper "Linear-time dynamics using Lagrange multipliers" has a discussion and comparison of both algorithms.

References

External links
 Featherstone Multibody in Bullet Physics engine
Featherstone's algorithm implementation in the Moby rigid body dynamics simulator
Source code for implementation of Featherstone's algorithm
Description and references
Mirtich's Thesis
Baraff's Lagrange multiplier method
Roy Featherstone's home page

Mechanics
Computational physics
Computer physics engines